Tyra Gittens (born 6 June 1998) is an Olympic athlete from Trinidad and Tobago. Gittens set 6 national records for Trinidad and Tobago indoor records in Pentathlon 4746 points, high jump 1.93 m (6 ft 4 in), and long jump 6.68 m (21 ft 11 in), Trinidad and Tobago outdoor records in Heptathlon 6418 points, high jump 1.95 m (6 ft 5 in), and long jump 6.96 m (22 ft 10 in).

Her hometown is Saint Augustine, Trinidad and Tobago, and she went to high school in Nashville at The Ensworth School before attending Texas A&M University to complete a BA Degree and University of Texas at Austin to pursue a master's degree.

In July 2017, Gittens broke her own national junior heptathlon record in winning the Pan American Combined Events Cup in Ottawa, Canada, gaining 5,490 points in the seven-discipline event to improve on the 5,337-point standard she had established in 2016.

Competing in the long jump at the 2022 World Athletics Championships Gittens finished 19th  in the qualifying heats with a best jump of 6.44m.

NCAA
Gittens is an 18-time NCAA Division 1 All-American, 3-time NCAA Champion, 5-time Southeastern Conference Champion, and 20-time All-SEC honoree.

Gittens won silver in the women’s long jump at the 2021 National Collegiate Athletic Association NCAA Division I Outdoor Track and Field Championships in Eugene, Oregon. She did however win gold in the heptathlon, despite the fact she injured her ankle in the days before the event.

In Texas on 14 May 2021 at SEC Outdoor Track and Field Championships, she jumped 6.96m to place her inside the top 10 for the year so far and set Trinidad and Tobago records in Heptathlon 6418 points, high jump , and long jump . Her performance at the Southeastern Conference Outdoor Track and Field Championships (SEC) in Texas, as well as attaining the Olympic standard for the delayed 2020 Tokyo Olympics in the long jump, she won silver in the women’s high jump competition with a height of 1.89m, she missed out on qualifying for the heptathlon at the 2020 Olympics on that day by just two points, accumulating 6,418 points in winning the seven-discipline event.

In Fayetteville, Arkansas on 11 March 2021 at NCAA Indoor Track and Field Championships, she jumped 6.68m to place her inside the top 10 for the year so far and set Trinidad and Tobago records in Pentathlon 4746 points, high jump , and long jump .

References

1998 births
Living people
Trinidad and Tobago female athletes
People from Tunapuna–Piarco
Texas A&M Aggies women's track and field athletes
Competitors at the 2019 Summer Universiade
Athletes (track and field) at the 2019 Pan American Games
Pan American Games competitors for Trinidad and Tobago
Athletes (track and field) at the 2020 Summer Olympics
Olympic athletes of Trinidad and Tobago
Texas A&M Aggies men's track and field athletes
Texas A&M University alumni
University of Texas at Austin alumni
Texas Longhorns men's track and field athletes